Joshua Liam "Josh" Rose (born 16 December 1981) is an Australian professional football (soccer) player who plays as a left back for National Premier Leagues Northern NSW side Edgeworth. He previously featured in the A-League for New Zealand Knights, Central Coast Mariners, and Melbourne City, as well as in the National Soccer League for Brisbane Strikers and in the Liga I with Universitatea Craiova.

Club career

Universitatea Craiova
Before joining the Romanian club Universitatea Craiova he played for the New Zealand Knights in the A-League and the Brisbane Strikers in the National Soccer League.

In Romania, Rose played for three years, and was really appreciated by Stiinta's fans.

Central Coast Mariners
On 8 March 2010, he signed a two-year deal with A-League club Central Coast Mariners. This was Graham Arnold's first signing since becoming coach of the club. On Thursday 17 June He made his debut and scored for the team in a friendly against fellow Gosford club Central Coast Lightning in which the Mariners won 7–1. Rose had an outstanding first season with the club, helping it to a second-placed finish and a Grand Final appearance. Rose also won the prestigious Peter Turnbull medal for Mariners player of the season.

On 20 July 2013, Rose started for the A-League All Stars in the inaugural A-League All Stars Game against Manchester United, a match in which the A-League All Stars were thrashed 5–1, courtesy of goals from Danny Welbeck, Jesse Lingard and Robin van Persie. Rose was substituted off in the 64th minute of the match, and was replaced by Western Sydney Wanderers forward Mark Bridge.

Melbourne City
On 11 August 2016, Rose left Central Coast Mariners to join Melbourne City on a one-year contract.

On 1 May 2017, Melbourne City announced Rose's contract would not be renewed.

Return to Central Coast Mariners
On 3 July 2017, Rose returned to Central Coast Mariners, signing a one-year contract. On 6 April 2018, Rose announced his A-League retirement at the end of the season.

Edgeworth
On 2 May 2018, Rose joined National Premier Leagues Northern NSW side Edgeworth.

Career statistics

Honours

Club
Central Coast Mariners
 A-League Championship: 2012–13
 A-League Premiership: 2011–12

Individual
 Mariners Medal: 2010–11
 A-League PFA Team of the Season: 2010–11, 2011–12
 A-League All Star: 2013, 2014

References

External links
 
 Josh Rose at Aussie Footballers
 

1981 births
Living people
Soccer players from Brisbane
Australian expatriate soccer players
Expatriate footballers in Romania
Australian expatriate sportspeople in Romania
A-League Men players
National Soccer League (Australia) players
Liga I players
National Premier Leagues players
Brisbane Strikers FC players
New Zealand Knights FC players
FC U Craiova 1948 players
Central Coast Mariners FC players
Melbourne City FC players
Edgeworth Eagles FC players
Association football defenders
Australian soccer players